Hashim Amla is a retired cricketer who represented the South Africa national cricket team for 15 years. He has scored centuries (100 or more runs in a single innings) in Test and One Day International (ODI) matches on 28 and 27 occasions respectively. Former England captain Geoffrey Boycott once said about him that, "he bats in a way that gives very little hope for the bowlers" and "he plays the same way at the start of his innings as he does at the end of it".

Amla made his Test debut against India at Eden Gardens, Kolkata, in 2004. His first century came two years later against New Zealand at the Newlands Cricket Ground, Cape Town. His score of 311 not out, against England at The Oval, London, in 2012, is the only triple century by a South African batsman in Test cricket. Amla has scored Test centuries at sixteen cricket grounds, including ten at venues outside South Africa. In Tests, he has scored centuries against eight different opponents, and has the most centuries (six) against England. , Amla has the second-highest number of centuries for South Africa in Tests.

Amla made his ODI debut in 2008 against Bangladesh at the Chittagong Divisional Stadium, Chittagong. His first century came in the same year against the same team at the Willowmoore Park, Benoni. His highest ODI score of 159 was made against Ireland at the Manuka Oval, Canberra in 2015. His 27 centuries in the format is a South African record. Amla has played 38 Twenty20 International (T20I) matches without scoring a century; his highest score in the format is 97 not out. , Amla has the sixth-highest number of centuries across all formats in international cricket.

Key
 *  Remained not out
   Man of the match
   Captain of India in that match
 (D/L)  The result of the match was based upon the Duckworth–Lewis method

Test centuries

One Day International cricket centuries

Footnotes

References

External links
 
 

Amla
Amla, Hashim